Trud is a rural locality (a settlement) in Pekshinskoye Rural Settlement, Petushinsky District, Vladimir Oblast, Russia. The population was 860 as of 2010. There are 12 streets.

Geography 
Trud is located on the Bolshaya Lipnya River, 17 km northeast of Petushki (the district's administrative centre) by road. Antushovo is the nearest rural locality.

References 

Rural localities in Petushinsky District